Hayden Kevin Shell (23 March 1937 – 1 November 2015) was an Australian politician.

He was born in Geelong to Alick Humphrey Shell, a painter, and Florrie Coone. He attended local state schools and became a postmaster. From 1970 to 1974 he was state secretary of the Postal Clerks Union; he also joined the Labor Party in 1971. He was a councillor on Geelong West City Council from 1976 to 1982. In 1982 he was elected to the Victorian Legislative Assembly as the member for Geelong West, moving to Geelong in 1985. He lost his seat in 1992, but served on Greater Geelong City Council from 1995 to 1998.

References

1937 births
2015 deaths
Australian Labor Party members of the Parliament of Victoria
Members of the Victorian Legislative Assembly
Politicians from Geelong
Victoria (Australia) local councillors